Edward Parsons (1907–1991) was an American architect who practiced in Nevada and was a leader in historic preservation.
He was born in Tonopah, Nevada in 1907, went to school in Salt Lake City, Utah and in Reno, Nevada, and studied architecture at University of Southern California and the University of Pennsylvania.

One of his works, the J. Clarence Kind House, at 751 Marsh Ave., in Reno, Nevada, is listed on the U.S. National Register of Historic Places.
He assisted in the restoration of numerous buildings, was state preservation coordinator in Nevada for the American Institute of Architects, and was active in state and local historic review bodies.

Architectural works include:
Incline High School
University of Nevada, Reno, buildings:
Fleischmann Agriculture and Home Economics building
Orvis School of Nursing
Medical School complex
J. Clarence Kind House

Specific restoration projects to which he contributed include:
Nevada State Capitol Building
Morrill Hall, University of Nevada, Reno
Bowers Mansion
Lake Mansion 
Berlin Mill 
Virginia City Courthouse 
Belmont Courthouse
Genoa Courthouse 
Fort Churchill

He was interviewed within the University of Nevada's Oral Historic Project during 1981, and donated numerous of his design drawings in 1982.

References

External links 
Family Bike Tour of the Historic Buildings of Downtown Reno, including photos and description of numerous Parsons works
A Guide to the Edward S. Parsons Architectural Drawings, NAA3. Special Collections, University Libraries, University of Nevada, Reno

Architects from Nevada
1907 births
1991 deaths
20th-century American architects
People from Tonopah, Nevada
University of Pennsylvania School of Design alumni
USC School of Architecture alumni